Mopsus (Ancient Greek: Μόψος, Mopsos) was the name of one of two famous seers in Greek mythology; his rival being Calchas. A historical or legendary Mopsos or Mukšuš may have been the founder of a house in power at widespread sites in the coastal plains of Pamphylia and Cilicia (in today's Turkey) during the early Iron Age.

Mythological figures 

 Mopsus, son of Manto either by Rhacius or Apollo.
 Mopsus, an Argonaut and son of Ampyx by a nymph.
 Mopsus, a Thracian commander who had lived long before the Trojan War. Along with Sipylus the Scythian, this Mopsus had been driven into exile from Thrace by its king Lycurgus. Sometime later, he and Sipylus defeated the Libyan Amazons in a pitched battle, in which their queen Myrine was slain, and the Thracians pursued the surviving Amazons all the way to Libya.

Historical person
The Christian chronicler Eusebius of Caesarea was as convinced of Mopsus' historicity as his pagan predecessors and contemporaries: in his parallel chronologies he entered under the year corresponding to 1184/83 Mopsus reigned in Cilicia. In the early 16th century, German chronicler Johannes Aventinus placed him in the reign of Ingaevone, in ca. 22nd century BC, along the Sava River, where, allegedly, he defeated Myrine.

Names similar to Mopsos, whether Greek or Anatolian, are also attested in Near Eastern languages. Since the discovery of a bilingual Hieroglyphic Luwian-Phoenician inscription in Karatepe (in Cilicia) in 1946–7, it has been conjectured that Mopsos was a historical person. The inscription is dated to c. 700 BC, and the person speaking in it, ’-z-t-w-d (Phoenician) / Azatiwada (Luwian), professes to be king of the d-n-n-y-m / Hiyawa, and describes his dynasty as "the house of M-p-š / Muksa". Apparently, he is a descendant of Mopsus. The relationship between the earlier form Muksa, preserved in Luwian transmission, and the later form M-p-š / Mopsos, preserved in Phoenician transmission, is indicative of the evolution of Greek labiovelars and can hardly be explained otherwise. The Phoenician name of the people recalls one of the Homeric names of the Greeks, Danaoi with the -m plural, whereas the Luwian name Hiyawa probably goes back to Hittite Ahhiyā(wa), which is, according to most interpretations, the "Achaean", or Mycenaean Greek, settlement in Asia Minor. Ancient Greek authors ascribe a central role to Mopsus in the colonization of Pamphylia.

A 13th-century date for the historical Mopsus may be confirmed by a Hittite tablet from Boğazkale which mentions a person called Mukšuš in connection with Madduwattaš of Arzawa and Attarsiya of Ahhiyā. This text is dated to the reign of Arnuwandaš III. Therefore, some scholars associate Mopsus' activities along the coast of Asia Minor and the Levant with the Sea Peoples' attacking Egypt in the beginning of the 12th century BC, one of those peoples being the Denyen—comparable to the d-n-n-y-m of the Karatepe inscription. The Sea People identification is, however, questioned by other scholars.

The name of the king erecting the Karatepe inscription, Azatiwada, is probably related to the toponym Aspendos, the name of a city in Pamphylia founded by the Argives according to Strabo (14.4.2). The name of the city is written  (Estwediius) on coins of the 5th century BC. Presumably, it was an earlier Azatiwada, the ancestor of our king, that gave his name to the city. The name does not appear to be Greek of origin (= Luwian "Lover of the Sun God [Wa(n)da]"?, or "Sun-god (Tiwad) love (him)", according to a more recent interpretation). The ethnicity of Mopsus himself is not clear: The fragmentary Lydian historiographer Xanthus made him a Lydian campaigning in Phoenicia. If the transmission of Nicolaus of Damascus, who quotes him, is believable, Xanthus wrote the name with -ks-, like in the Hittite and Luwian texts. Given that Lydian also belongs to the Anatolian language family, it is possible that Xanthus relied on a local non-Greek tradition according to which Mukšuš was a Luwian.

The name Mopsus or Mopsos is also mentioned in the more recently discovered Çineköy inscription. This is also a Hieroglyphic Luwian-Phoenician bilingual inscription, similar to the Karatepe inscription.

Notes

References
Charles Anthon, A Classical Dictionary (1842).
 R. D. Barnett, 1953. "Mopsos", in: Journal of Hellenic Studies 73 (1953), pp. 140–143.
Walter Burkert, 1992. The Orientalizing Revolution: Near Eastern Influence on Early Archaic Greece (Cambridge:Harvard University Press).
 Robert Drews, 1994: The End of the Bronze Age: Changes in Warfare and the Catastrophe ca. 1200 B.C. (Princeton University Press).
 Margalit Finkelberg, 2005. Greeks and Pre-Greeks: Aegean Prehistory and Greek Heroic Tradition (Cambridge University Press).
 Robin Lane Fox, 2008. Travelling Heroes: Greeks and Their Myths in the Epic Age of Homer, pp. 206–26.
 N. G. L. Hammond, 1975. "The End of Mycenaean Civilization and the Dark Age. (b) The Literary Tradition for the Migrations", in: The Cambridge Ancient History, vol. II, part 2, ed. by J.E.S. Edwards, C.J. Gadd, N.G.L. Hammond and E. Sollberger, (Cambridge University Press), pp. 678–712.
 Anna Margherita Jasink and Mauro Marino, forthcoming. "The West Anatolian origins of the Que kingdom dynasty", in: Proceedings of the 6th International Congress of Hittitology, Roma 5-9 settembre 2005.
John Lemprière, 1850. Lemprière's Classical Dictionary. ("Mopsus," p. 422). (London. Bracken Books) Reprint 1994. paperback. 
 Ilya Yakubovich, 2010. Sociolinguistics of the Luvian Language. Leiden: Brill. 
 Ilya Yakubovich, 2015. Phoenician and Luwian in Early Iron Age Cilicia, Anatolian Studies 65, pp. 35–53.
 K. Lawson Younger, 1998. "The Phoenician Inscription of Azatiwada: An Integrated Reading", Journal of Semitic Studies 43, pp. 11–47.

External links

Archaeological sources on Greek mythology
Argonauts
Characters in the Argonautica
Denyen
Greek mythology of Anatolia